Jacqueline Donny (2 August 1927 – 14 February 2021) was a French model and beauty pageant contestant.

Career
After being awarded Miss Paris in 1947, she was runner up to that year's Miss France, . The next year, she became the 18th Miss France, and was crowned Miss Europe 1948.

References

1927 births
2021 deaths
French female models
Place of birth missing